is a manga publishing label affiliated with the Japanese publishing company ASCII Media Works (formerly MediaWorks) and is aimed at a male audience. Aside from the main Dengeki Comics label, there is the related Dengeki Comics EX label, which was launched in 1992, and the Dengeki Comics NEXT label, which was launched in 2013. A large amount of the manga published under Dengeki Comics was originally serialized in the manga magazine Dengeki Daioh.

Manga published

Dengeki Comics

A.D. Police
Ano Natsu de Matteru
Advance of Z
Banner of the Stars
Betterman
Blood Alone
Blue Drop
Boogiepop Dual: Losers' Circus
Bubblegum Crisis
Chōjō Kidō Siren
Chōkankaku Anal Man
Comic Party
Clannad
Crest of the Stars
D4 Princess
Dejibara
Doki Doki Time Toraburaa
Doll Master
Double Breed
Ef: A Fairy Tale of the Two.
Engeki Shōjo Inochi
Fafner of the Azure
Figure 17
Futakoi Alternative
G-On Riders
Gakuen Utopia Manabi Straight!
Gokudo
Gunparade March
Gunslinger Girl
Happy Lesson
Hayate X Blade
Himawari Jigoku
Himeyaka Himesama
Houkago Play
Infinite Ryvius
Kagihime Monogatari Eikyū Alice Rondo
Kamichu!
Kanon
Kashimashi: Girl Meets Girl
Koharubiyori
Kurogane Communication
Kyōhaku Dog's
Lunch Box
Magical Play
Maniac Road
Marriage Royale
Mobile Suit Gundam
Mobile Suit Gundam 0079
Mobile Suit Gundam 0083: Stardust Memory
Mobile Suit Gundam Moon Crisis
Mobile Suit Gundam MS Generation
Mobile Suit Gundam Reon
Mobile Suit Gundam Silhouette Formula 91
MS Military History: Mobile Suit Gundam 0079 Supplementary Biography
New MS Militar History: Mobile Suit Gundam 0079 Collected Short Stories
Side Story of Gundam Z
Murcurius Pretty
Murder Princess
Muv-Luv
Muv-Luv Unlimited
Na Na Na Na
Otome wa Boku ni Koishiteru
Please Teacher!
Please Twins!
Pretty Manizu
Prism Ark
Raimuiro Senkitan
Renkin 3-kyū Magical ? Pokān
Root Neko Neko
Scape-God
Shakugan no Shana
Sister Princess Repure
Sola
Starship Operators
Stellvia of the Universe
Strawberry Marshmallow
Strawberry Panic!
Super Robot Wars
Tengen Toppa Gurren Lagann
Ticktack Gangan
Train+Train
To Aru Kagaku no Railgun
To Heart 2
To Heart
To Heart: Remember My Memories
Tsukihime
Uchūjin Plume
Uta Kata
Watashitachi no Tamura-kun
Yoake Mae yori Ruri Iro na
Yotsuba&!
Yume Mitai na Hoshi Mitai na
Yumeria

Dengeki Comics EX

Angel Foyson
Azumanga Daioh
Chronos Haze
Dark Whisper
Dragon Knight 4
Godannar
God Eater 2
Gun Driver
Gunbare! Game Tengoku
Gunparade March
Hexamoon Guardians
Ichigeki Sacchu!! HoiHoi-san
Iono-sama Fanatics
Iguna Cross Reigōeki
Kamikirimushi
Kanna
Kokoro Library
Komorebi Namikimichi
Kura Kura
Lady Faust
Little Busters!
Lythtis
Momoe Scythe
Maromayu
Murcurius Pretty
Natural
Ninin Ga Shinobuden
Nocturne
Pure Marioneeshon
Ryūsei Suzumeshi Kirara Star
Sekigan Jū Mission
Senki to Kajitsu
Sister Red
Stratos 4
The King of Braves GaoGaiGar
Tsukigime Happy Apartment
Yoiyami Gentō Sōshi
Yūkyū Mokushiroku Eidoronjadoo
Yuri Seijin Naokosan
Zegapain

Dengeki Comics Next

A Certain Scientific Accelerator
A Certain Scientific Railgun: Astral Buddy
Alderamin on the Sky
And You Thought There Is Never a Girl Online?
Angel's 3Piece!
Tenshi no 3P! no 3P!!
Black Bullet
Between the Sky and Sea
Bloom Into You
Buddy Complex
Buddy Complex: Coupling of Battlefield
Charlotte
Charlotte The 4-koma: Seishun o Kakenukero!
Celestial Method
Eromanga Sensei
Etotama
Gabriel DropOut
Girlish Number
Girls Beyond the Wasteland
Hitori Bocchi no Marumaru Seikatsu
Idol Incidents
Kantai Collection: The perched naval base
Kiznaiver
Love Live! School Idol Diary
Love Live! Sunshine!!
Mitsuboshi Colors
Nagi no Asukara 4-koma Gekijō: Nagiyon
Nora to Ōjo to Noraneko Heart: Pirikara Yūsha Nobuchina
Plastic Memories: Say to Good-bye
Seishun Buta Yarō wa Bunny Girl-senpai no Yume o Minai
Shirobako: Kaminoyama Kōkō Animation Dōkōkai
Sword Art Online Alternative Gun Gale Online
The Isolator
This Art Club Has a Problem!

References

External links
Dengeki Comics' official website 
''Dengeki Comics''' publishing list